John Willie Parker (5 July 1925 – August 1988) was an English professional footballer.

Parker started his career across the River Mersey from his Birkenhead birthplace as an amateur for Everton in 1947, though he did not make his debut until 1951. He was the club's leading scorer for four seasons in a row, from 1951–52 to 1954–55, scoring 31 times in 1953-54 as Everton was promoted from Football League Division Two to Division One, one half of a prolific partnership with Dave Hickson. He left for Bury in 1956, playing for the club until 1959, having made 82 appearances and scoring 43 goals.

References

1925 births
1988 deaths
English footballers
Everton F.C. players
Bury F.C. players
Association football defenders